The Shearer Schoolhouse Revival—a series of meetings conducted in mid-1896 in Cherokee County, North Carolina, United States—was characterized by what participants believed to be the biblical experience of speaking in tongues.  It is believed that this was the first mass outpouring of the Holy Ghost (i.e., with tongues) since the time of the Early Church.  

Many of the participants of these worship gatherings eventually organized into what is now known as the Church of God (Cleveland).

This event predated the 1906 Azusa Street Revival by nearly a decade, although the Azusa Street Revival is generally held to be the event that started the Pentecostal Movement in the United States. This suggests the Azusa Revival can be seen as one of several similar religious phenomena happening at the same time. There is no doubt, however, that Azusa had a greater "impact" and is more widely known.

References 

1896 in the United States
History of Christianity in the United States
Pentecostalism in North Carolina
Cherokee County, North Carolina
Christian revivals